Quantum noise is noise arising from the indeterminate state of matter in accordance with fundamental principles of quantum mechanics, specifically the uncertainty principle and via zero-point energy fluctuations. Quantum noise is due to the apparently discrete nature of the small quantum constituents such as electrons, as well as the discrete nature of quantum effects, such as photocurrents. 

Quantified noise is similar to classical noise theory and will not always return an asymmetric spectral density. 

Shot noise as coined by J. Verdeyen is a form of quantum noise related to the statistics of photon counting, the discrete nature of electrons, and intrinsic noise generation in electronics. In contrast to shot noise, the quantum mechanical uncertainty principle sets a lower limit to a measurement. The uncertainty principle requires any amplifier or detector to have noise.

Macroscopic manifestations of quantum phenomena are easily disturbed, so quantum noise is mainly observed in systems where conventional sources of noise are suppressed. In general, noise is uncontrolled random variation from an expected value and is typically unwanted. General causes are thermal fluctuations, mechanical vibrations, industrial noise, fluctuations of voltage from a power supply, thermal noise due to Brownian motion, instrumentation noise, a laser's output mode deviating from the desired mode of operation, etc. If present, and unless carefully controlled, these other noise sources typically dominate and mask quantum noise. 

In astronomy, a device which pushes against the limits of quantum noise is the LIGO gravitational wave observatory.

A Heisenberg microscope

Quantum noise can be illustrated by considering a Heisenberg microscope where an atom's position is measured from the scattering of photons. The uncertainty principle is given as, 

The precision of the position measurement can be increased at the expense of knowing the atom's momentum. When the position is precisely known enough backaction begins to affect the measurement in two ways. First, it will impart momentum back onto the measuring devices in extreme cases. Secondly, we have decreasing future knowledge of the atom's future position. Precise and sensitive instrumentation will approach the uncertainty principle at sufficiently control environments.

Basics of noise theory
Noise is of practical concern for precision engineering and engineered systems approaching the standard quantum limit. Typical engineered consideration of quantum noise is for quantum nondemolition measurement and quantum point contact. So quantifying noise is useful.   
A signal's noise is quantified as the fourier transform of its autocorrelation. 
The autocorrelation of a signal is given as,

The time average, is zero and our  is a voltage signal. Its fourier transform is,

because we measure a voltage over a finite time window. The Wiener–Khinchin theorem generally states that a noise's power spectrum is given as the autocorrelation of a signal, i.e.,

The above relation is sometimes called the power spectrum or spectral density.
In the above outline, we assumed that 
Our noise is stationary or the probability does not change over time. Only the time difference matters.
Noise is due to a very large number of fluctuating charge so that the central limit theorem applie, i.e., the noise is Gaussian or normally distributed.
 decays to zero rapidly over some time .
We sample over a sufficiently large time, that our integral scales as a random walk .

One can show  that an ideal "top-hat" signal, which may correspond to a finite measurement of a voltage over some time, will produce noise across its entire spectrum as a sinc function. Even in the classical case, noise is produced.

Classical to quantum noise

To study quantum noise, one replaces the corresponding classical measurements with quantum operators, e.g.,

where  are the quantum statistical average using the density matrix in the Heisenberg picture.

Quantum noise and the uncertainty principle
The Heisenberg uncertainty implies the existence of noise. An operator with a hermitian conjugate follows the relationship, . Define  as  where  is real. We can show the following, 

The first term on the right corresponds to the Commutator relation and would cancel out if the x and y commuted. That is the origin of our quantum noise.

It is demonstrative to let  and  correspond to position and momentum that meets the well known commutator relation, . Then our new expression is,

If the second term on the right vanishes, then we recover the Heisenberg uncertainty principle.

Harmonic motion and weakly coupled heat bath

Consider the motion of a simple harmonic oscillator with mass, and frequency, coupled to some heat bath which keeps the system in equilibrium. The equations of motion are given as, 

The quantum autocorrelation is then,

Classically, there is no correlation between position and momentum. The uncertainty principle requires the second term to be nonzero.
We can take the equipartition theorem or the fact that in equilibrium the energy is equally shared among a molecule/atoms degrees of freedom in thermal equilibrium , i.e.,

In the classical autocorrelation, we have

 

while in the quantum autocorrelation we have

 

Where the fraction terms in parentheses is the zero-point energy uncertainty. The  is the Bose-Einstein population distribution. Notice that the quantum  is asymmetric in the due to the imaginary autocorrelation. One can show that the quantum approaches the classical . This allows

Physical interpretation of spectral density

Typically, the positive frequency of the spectral density corresponds to the flow of energy into the oscillator (for example, the photons' quantized field), while the negative frequency corresponds to the emitted of energy from the oscillator. Physically, an asymmetric spectral density would correspond to either the net flow of energy from or to our oscillator model.

Linear gain and quantum uncertainty

Most optical communications use amplitude modulation where the quantum noise is predominantly the shot noise.  A laser's quantum noise, when not considering shot noise, is the uncertainty of its electric field's amplitude and phase. That uncertainty becomes observable when a quantum amplifier preserves phase. The phase noise becomes important when the energy of the frequency modulation or phase modulation is comparable to the energy of the signal (frequency modulation is more robust than amplitude modulation due to the additive noise intrinsic to amplitude modulation).

Linear amplification

An ideal noiseless gain cannot exit.  Consider the amplification of stream of photons, an ideal linear noiseless gain, and the Energy-Time uncertainty relation. 

We can substitute these relations into our energy-time uncertainty equation to find the number-phase uncertainty relation or the uncertainty in the phase and photon numbers. 

Let an ideal linear noiseless gain,  act on the photon stream. We also assume a unity quantum efficiency, or every photon is converted to a photocurrent. The output will be following with no noise added.

The phase will be modified too,

Substituting our output gain and phase uncertainties, gives us

So a linear noiseless amplifier cannot increase its signal without noise.
A deeper analysis done by H. Heffner 
showed the minimum noise power output required to meet the Heisenberg uncertainty principle is given as

Shot noise and instrumentation
In precision optics with highly stabilized lasers and efficient detectors, quantum noise refers to the fluctuations of signal.

The random error of interferometric measurements of position, due to the discrete character of photons measurement, is another quantum noise. The uncertainty of position of a probe in probe microscopy may also  attributable to quantum noise; but not the dominant mechanism governing resolution. 

In an electric circuit, the random fluctuations of a signal due to the discrete character of electrons can be called quantum noise. 
An experiment by S. Saraf, et .al.

demonstrated shot noise limited measurements as a demonstration of quantum noise measurements. Generally speaking, they amplified a Nd:YAG free space laser with minimal noise addition as it transitioned from linear to nonlinear amplification. The experiment required Fabry-Perot for filtering laser mode noises and selecting frequencies, two separate but identical probe and saturating beams to ensure uncorrelated beams, a zigzag slab gain medium, and a balanced detector for measuring quantum noise or shot-noise limited noise.

Shot Noise Power

The theory behind noise analysis of photon statistics (sometimes called the forward Kolmogorov equation) starts from the Masters equation from Shimoda et al. 

The above relation is describing the probability of finding  photons in radiation mode . This gives us a total of 4 photon transitions associated to one photon energy level. Its noise power is given as,

Where,
 is the power at the detector, 
 is the power limited shot noise, 
 the unsaturated gain and is also true for saturated gain, 
 is the efficiency factor. That is the product of transmission window efficiency to our photodetector, and quantum efficiency. 
 is the spontaneous emission factor that typically corresponds relative strength of spontaneous emission to stimulated emission. A value of unity would mean all doped ions are in the excited state. 
Sarif, et al. demonstrated quantum noise or shot noise limited measurements over a wide range of power gain that agreed with theory.

Zero-point fluctuations

Zero-point energy fluctuations are a well know result from undergraduate textbook.
Generally speaking, at the lowest energy excitation of a quantized field that permeates all space, we will have some energy variance over some time. This accounts for vacuum fluctuations that permeate all space.

This vacuum fluctuation or quantum noise will effect classical systems. This manifest as quantum decoherence in an entangled system, normally attributed to thermal differences in the conditions surrounding each entangled particle. Because entanglement is studied intensely in simple pairs of entangled photons, for example, decoherence observed in experiments could well be synonymous with "quantum noise" as to the source of the decoherence. Vacuum fluctuation is a possible causes for a quanta of energy to spontaneously appear in a given field or spacetime, then thermal differences must be associated with this event. Hence, it would cause decoherence in an entangled system in proximity of the event.

Coherent states and noise of a quantum amplifier
A laser is described by the coherent state of light, or the superposition of harmonic oscillators eigenstates. Erwin Schrödinger first derived the coherent state for the Schrödinger equation to meet the correspondence principle in 1926. 

The laser is a quantum mechanical phenomena (see Maxwell–Bloch equations, rotating wave approximation, and semi-classical model of a two level atom).  The Einstein coefficients and the laser rate equations are adequate if one is interested in the population levels and one does not need to account for population quantum coherences (the off diagonal terms in a density matrix). Photons of the order of 108 corresponds to a moderate energy. The relative error of measurement of the intensity due to the quantum noise is on the order of 10−5. This is considered to be of good precision for most of applications.

Quantum amplifier
A quantum amplifier is an amplifier which operates close to the quantum limit. Quantum noise becomes important when a small signal is amplified. A small signal's quantum uncertainties in its quadrature are also amplified; this sets a lower limit to the amplifier. A quantum amplifier's noise is its output amplitude and phase. Generally, a laser is amplified across a spread of wavelengths around a central wavelength, some mode distribution, and polarization spread. But one can consider a single mode amplification and generalize to many different modes.  A phase-invariant amplifier preserves the phase of the input gain without drastic changes to the output phase mode.  

Quantum amplification can be represented with a unitary operator, as stated in D. Kouznetsov 1995 paper.

See also
Quantum error correction
Quantum optics
Quantum limit
Shot noise
Quantum harmonic oscillator

References

Further reading
Clerk, Aashish A. Quantum Noise and quantum measurement. Oxford University Press.
Clerk, Aashish A., et al. Introduction to Quantum Noise, measurement, and amplification,Reviews of Modern Physics 82, 1155-1208.
Gardiner, C. W. and Zoller, P. Quantum Noise: A Handbook of Markovian and Non-Markovian Quantum Stochastic Methods with Applications to Quantum Optics, Springer, 2004, 978-3540223016

Sources
 C. W. Gardiner and Peter Zoller, Quantum Noise: A Handbook of Markovian and Non-Markovian Quantum Stochastic Methods with Applications to Quantum Optics, Springer-Verlag (1991, 2000, 2004).

Quantum optics
Laser science